Fresno High School is a four-year secondary school located in Fresno, California. Fresno High is the oldest high school in the Fresno metropolitan area and one of the few International Baccalaureate schools. As of 2021, Linda Laettner is the 29th and current principal of Fresno High.

History 
Fresno High School was founded in 1889. The new school quickly outgrew the available space and had to be moved to the White School, where the Memorial Auditorium is located today. Plans for a new high school building were developed. In September 1896, the school year began in the new building on 0 Street between Stanislaus and Tuolumne streets. The new back structure, with its clock tower, had the latest and most modern facilities, including a chemistry laboratory, gymnasium, library, and lecture hall.

In 1922, the school moved to its present site at 1839 North Echo Avenue, near Palm and McKinley Avenues. Fresno High School is surrounded by large homes (originally one of Fresno's affluent areas) and large Fresno ash and pine trees. In 2002 the historic Royce Hall building caught fire and suffered minimal damage.

The campus is divided into several components. The two main components are "South Side" and "North Side", named so from their campus location. South Side campus houses Title I offices, the business, foreign language, science, and mathematics divisions. The North Side houses English, social sciences, art, and history divisions. Physical education, leadership and JROTC are housed on the westernmost portion of the campus. The drama and music divisions, in addition to various miscellaneous classrooms, are attached to Fresno High's historic Royce Hall. There is a little known fallout shelter entrance at the rear of the handball courts, (in the middle where the metal grate is on the ground), that goes down stairs to a door that leads under "goat hill" and then under Royce Hall.

Renovations to Royce Hall were completed for the 2018–2019 school year. They were worked on throughout the 2017–2018 school year. The goal was to give the historic hall a modernization which included new carpeting, acoustic sound paneling, a sound booth located near the auditorium entrance and the removal and relocation of a handicap elevator to make more room for stair access to the stage.

Academics 
Fresno High School offers its students the full International Baccalaureate diplomas. The school has been offering its graduate students full IB diplomas since June 2007. The campus offers several advanced placement courses and requires the study of foreign language in order to receive a diploma, along with the completion of a 4,000 word essay and 150 hours of community service. The campus has received poor academic achievement scores in the past, but it has shown impressive improvement. The campus employs 133 full- and part-time instructors, in addition to several guidance counselors, classified staff, administrative employees, one full-time psychologist and one full-time family therapist. The curriculum has been broadened to meet the needs of the world's professions. However the opportunity to pursue a classical education, including the study of Latin, is still available to the students of Fresno High School. The campus offers Spanish and Latin language courses.

Extracurricular activities

Performing arts 
Fresno High is home to numerous Performing Arts which are offered to students as elective courses. Performing arts courses that are offered currently consist of: Theater, which includes IB Level options, Piano 1&2, Marching Band, Concert Band, Jazz Band, Intermediate Symphonic Orchestra, Advanced Symphonic Orchestra, Concert Choir and Chamber Choir.

Sports 
Fresno High is an active athletic school, maintaining several teams for both boys and girls in addition to several co-ed teams. The Fresno High football team continues its rivalry game against Roosevelt High School, known as the Little Big Game. The Little Big Game is also known as the Pig Game. It is an annual game in which Fresno High plays against its rival Roosevelt High School for a pig statue to hold for that year. The pig was at one time stolen from Fresno High's attendance office and a replacement was made. The campus offers Prep and Cheer, football, cross country, soccer (valley champion 2010–2011 season), baseball, golf, tennis, water polo, softball teams, basketball, track and field, swim, badminton, and a lacrosse team.

Notable alumni 

Armen Alchian, economist
Charles Amirkhanian, composer and broadcaster
Phil Austin, writer and comedian of The Firesign Theatre
Ross Bagdasarian, creator of Alvin and the Chipmunks
Frank Chance, Major League Baseball First Baseman and Manager in the  Hall of Fame
Mike Connors, actor in films and star of TV series Mannix
Pat Corrales, Major League Baseball catcher and manager
Sean Halton, Major League Baseball first baseman
Cher, singer and Academy Award-winning actress
Dick Contino, accordionist and actor
Lee Cronbach, educational psychologist
Gordon Dunn, Silver Medalist - Discus Throw (1936 Summer Olympics), Mayor of Fresno (1949-1957)
Dick Ellsworth, Major League Baseball pitcher
Geoffrey Gamble, former president, Montana State University
Jon Hall, actor
David Harris, anti-war activist and journalist
Bobby Jones, New York Mets and San Diego Padres pitcher
Skip Kenney, swimming coach
Arthur Scott King, physicist and astrophysicist
Jim Maloney, Major League Baseball pitcher
Monte Pearson, Major League Baseball pitcher, 4-time World Series champion
Sam Peckinpah, Film Director, Screenwriter notable for The Wild Bunch
Les Richter, Los Angeles Rams football player
William Saroyan, playwright
Tom Seaver, Major League Baseball pitcher in Hall of Fame
Dick Selma, Major League Baseball pitcher
Ginny Simms, singer and film actress
Frederick C. Weyand – former U.S. Army Chief of Staff (1974-1976) and member of the Joint Chiefs of Staff

References 

High schools in Fresno, California
International Baccalaureate schools in California
Public high schools in California
1889 establishments in California
Educational institutions established in 1889